Lachnocapsa spathulata is a species of flowering plant in the family Brassicaceae, and the only species in the genus Lachnocaspa. It is found only on Socotra, Yemen. Its natural habitats are subtropical or tropical dry shrubland and rocky areas.

References

Brassicaceae
Endemic flora of Socotra
Vulnerable plants
Monotypic Brassicaceae genera
Taxonomy articles created by Polbot
Taxa named by Isaac Bayley Balfour